Savinskaya is a rural locality (a village) in Ustretskoye Rural Settlement, Syamzhensky District, Vologda Oblast, Russia. The population was 33 as of 2002.

Geography 
Savinskaya is located 25 km northwest of Syamzha (the district's administrative centre) by road. Yermakovskaya is the nearest rural locality.

References 

Rural localities in Syamzhensky District